Acapulco Gold is a 1976 crime film directed by Burt Brinckerhoff and starring Marjoe Gortner and Randi Oakes.

Premise
Insurance salesman Ralph Hollio (Marjoe Gortner) gets arrested for heroin smuggling in Acapulco. Captain Carl Solborg (Robert Lansing) breaks him out of jail to get his help to sail a boat to Hawaii.

Cast

References

External links
 

1970s crime thriller films
1976 crime drama films
American crime thriller films
American crime drama films
Films about drugs
Films scored by Craig Safan
Films set in Mexico
Films shot in Mexico
Films set in Hawaii
Films shot in Hawaii
1976 films
Films directed by Burt Brinckerhoff
1970s English-language films
1970s American films